Cramp & Co. was a building company in Philadelphia.  Many of its works are listed on the U.S. National Register of Historic Places.  It worked sometimes in conjunction with architect Henry deCourcy Richards.

Works (and variations on attribution) include:
Thomas Durham School, built 1909, 1600 Lombard St., Philadelphia, PA (Cramp & Co.), NRHP-listed
 The Bronx Opera House, built 1912-1913, 436 East 149th street, Bronx, New York 
Feltonville School No. 2, 4901 Rising Sun Ave., Philadelphia, PA (Cramp & Co.), NRHP-listed
Thomas Fitzsimons Junior High School, 2601 W. Cumberland St., Philadelphia, PA (Cramp & Co.), NRHP-listed
Horace Furness Junior High School, 1900 S. Third St., Philadelphia, PA (Cramp & Co.), NRHP-listed
Charles Wolcott Henry School, 601-645 W. Carpenter Ln., Philadelphia, PA (Cramp & Co.), NRHP-listed
John Story Jenks School, 8301-8317 Germantown Ave., Philadelphia, PA (Cramp & Co.), NRHP-listed
John L. Kinsey School, Sixty-fifth Ave. and Limekiln Pike, Philadelphia, PA (Cramp & Co.), NRHP-listed
Henry C. Lea School of Practice, 242 S. 47th St., Philadelphia, PA (Cramp & Co.), NRHP-listed
Alexander K. McClure School, 4139 N. 6th St., Philadelphia, PA (Cramp & Co.), NRHP-listed
Quakertown Passenger and Freight Station, Front and East Broad Sts., Quakertown, PA (Cramp and Co.), NRHP-listed
John Greenleaf Whittier School, 2600 Clearfield St., Philadelphia, PA (Cramp & Co.), NRHP-listed
St. James Building, 117 West Duval Street, Jacksonville, FL (terracotta)

References

Construction and civil engineering companies of the United States
Companies based in Philadelphia